Leisi is a small borough in Saaremaa Parish, Saare County in western Estonia.

Before the administrative reform in 2017, the borough was administrative centre of Leisi Parish.

References

Villages in Saare County